Acraea perenna, the falcate acraea, is a butterfly in the family Nymphalidae which is native to the African tropics and subtropics.

Range
It is found in Senegal, Sierra Leone, Liberia, Ivory Coast, Ghana, Togo, Nigeria, Cameroon, the Republic of the Congo, Angola, the Democratic Republic of the Congo, Uganda, Kenya, Ethiopia, Tanzania, Malawi and Zambia.

Description

A. perenna Dbl. and Hew. (54 e) is distinguished by the long, narrow forewing, with the termen emarginate, almost exactly the same shape as in Papilio antimachus; the discal dots are large and on the hindwing are placed near the base of their cellules (the one in 3 seems to be always absent); forewing above black with yellow-red hindmarginal spot, which covers the middle of cellules 1a to 2, beneath lighter, at the distal margin broadly yellowish with black veins and stripes on the interneural folds. Hindwing above black nearly to the discal dots, then with red transverse band and at the distal margin with black, red-spotted marginal band, beneath much lighter, at the base greenish yellow with free dots and some red spots or stripes close to the base; marginal band as above. Larva black with yellow spots; head and spines black. Sierra Leone to Angola, Uganda and Nairobi.
 In thesprio Oberth. (54 e) the red-yellow colour of the forewing more or less completely covers also the cell and the base of cellules 3 to 6. Katanga; Nyassaland; German and British East Africa. 
 kaffana Rothsch. (59 f) nearly agrees with thesprio, but has the discal dots larger and the marginal band of the hindwing broader. Abyssinia.

Subspecies
Acraea perenna perenna — Senegal, Sierra Leone, Liberia, Ivory Coast, Ghana, Togo, Nigeria, Cameroon, Congo, Angola, Democratic Republic of the Congo, Uganda, central Kenya, north-western Zambia
Acraea perenna kaffana Rothschild, 1902 — Ethiopia
Acraea perenna thesprio Oberthür, 1893 — coast of Kenya, eastern Tanzania, Malawi

Biology
The habitat consists of forests and forest-savanna mosaic in hilly country.

It is thought to be the main mimicry model for Graphium ridleyanus.

The larvae feed on Kolobopetalum chevalieri, Olobopetalum, Mikania (including M. saggitifera), Bridelia (including B. micrantha), Adenia and Urera species.

Taxonomy
It is a member of the Acraea circeis species group – but see also Pierre & Bernaud, 2014

References

External links

Die Gross-Schmetterlinge der Erde 13: Die Afrikanischen Tagfalter. Plate XIII 59 f ssp. kaffana
Images representing Acraea perenna at Bold
Images representing Acraea perenna thesprio at Bold

Butterflies described in 1847
perenna
Taxa named by Edward Doubleday